Guru Studio (stylized and known as GURU, and simply guru in their previous logo) is a Toronto-based entertainment company best known for PAW Patrol, Justin Time and Ever After High.

The company is currently producing original comedy-adventure series Big Blue with the CBC, and preschool series Pikwik Pack now airing on Disney Junior in the United States and Treehouse in Canada. Guru Studio also contributed visual development on the Academy Award nominated animated feature The Breadwinner.

On February 1, 2016, Guru Studio announced a partnership with Toon Boom Animation. Engineers from both companies will team up and work together to develop and incorporate software features into Toon Boom Harmony (the leading software in the animation industry).

In 2019, Guru Studio was voted #1 in by children's entertainment industry magazine Kidscreen  Hot 50 in the Production Category, and was voted in the top 10 in Licensing and Distribution categories.

Filmography

Original productions
 The Backyardigans (2004-2010)
 Justin Time (2011–2016)
 Mudpit (2012–2013)
 Dinopaws (2014–2015)
 Ever After High (2013–2016)
 PAW Patrol (2013-present) Shimmer and Shine (2015–2020)
 The Breadwinner (2017)
 True and the Rainbow Kingdom (2017–2019)
 Abby Hatcher (2019–2022)
 Pikwik Pack (2020–present) 
 Big Blue (2021–present)
 123 Number Squad! (2022-present)
 Sesame Street: Mecha Builders (2022-present)
 Little Big Planet (2023-present)
 Morphle (2024)
 Scoops! (TBA)

References

External links
Official Website

Canadian animation studios
Companies based in Toronto
Film production companies of Canada
2000 establishments in Ontario
Mass media companies established in 2000